Ben Abraham (born 12 May 1985) is an Australian folk singer and songwriter from Melbourne. Ben has collaborated with artists including Kesha, Macklemore & Ryan Lewis, Demi Lovato and Sara Bareilles. He co-wrote "Praying" by Kesha.

Career
Abraham's parents were both musicians who played together in the Indonesian pop group Pahama. Abraham initially sought to become a screenwriter, and concurrently began songwriting while working in a hospital. 

In 2014, he released his debut album, Sirens in Australia, which he described as "basically a roadmap of my awkward naïve insecure 20s". In March 2016, the album was reissued by Secretly Canadian. The album includes the track "This Is On Me", which features American vocalist Sara Bareilles, as well as appearances by fellow Australian Gotye. 

In 2016 and 2017, Abraham also co-wrote with artists Wafia, Ta-ku and Wrabel on their respective singles "Heartburn", "Meet in the Middle", and "Bloodstain." Abraham's voice has been compared to Guy Garvey and Peter Gabriel. CMJ's Eric Davidson calls Abraham's voice "delicate yet booming" and Sirens a "strong, electro-soul" record. 

At the APRA Music Awards of 2018 he won the Overseas Recognition Award and was nominated for Breakthrough Songwriter of the Year.

In September 2021, Abrahams announced the release of his forthcoming second studio album. On 1 October, the album's fifth single "I Am Here" was released, which is set to appear in the season premiere of ABC's Grey's Anatomy.

Discography

Albums

Singles

Other appearances

Awards and nominations

APRA Awards
The APRA Awards are held in Australia and New Zealand by the Australasian Performing Right Association to recognise songwriting skills, sales and airplay performance by its members annually. 

! 
|-
! rowspan="2"| 2018
| Ben Abraham
| Breakthrough Songwriter of the Year
| 
| rowspan="2"| 
|-
| Ben Abraham
| Overseas Recognition Award
| 
|}

References

APRA Award winners
Australian folk singers
Australian songwriters
Australian male singers
Musicians from Melbourne
Australian indie pop musicians
Living people
Secretly Canadian artists
1985 births